Lepidodactylus guppyi, also known commonly as the Solomons scaly-toed gecko or Guppy's gecko, is a species of gecko, a lizard in the family Gekkonidae. The species is endemic to islands in the southwestern Pacific Ocean.

Etymology
The specific name, guppyi, is in honor of British botanist Henry Brougham Guppy.

Geographic range
L. guppyi is found in the Bismarck Archipelago, the Solomon Islands, and Vanuatu.

Reproduction
L. guppyi is oviparous.

References

Further reading
Boulenger GA (1884). "Diagnoses of new Reptiles and Batrachians from the Solomon Islands, collected and presented to the British Museum by H. B. Guppy, Esq., H.M.S. ‘Lark’ ". Proc. Zool. Soc. London 1884: 210–213. (Lepidodactylus guppyi, new species, p. 210).
Boulenger GA (1885). Catalogue of the Lizards in the British Museum (Natural History). Second Edition. Volume I., Geckonidæ ... London: Trustees of the British Museum (Natural History). (Taylor and Francis, printers). xii + 436 pp. + Plates I-XXXII. (Lepidodactylus guppyi, pp. 166–167).

Lepidodactylus
Reptiles described in 1884